The First Line is an album by  Marcellus Hall. It is his first full-length album and was released by Glacial Pace in 2011. The album, which includes a booklet of drawings by Marcellus, has been compared to the likes of Robyn Hitchcock.

Critical reception
Exclaim! wrote: "Like many dusty blues punks before him it's the mantle of Dylan that Hall has chosen as armour, at least in terms of sound, though it's the sweetly poisoned inkwell of Jonathan Richman or Robyn Hitchcock from which his lyrics flow." The Observer wrote that "Hall lets the sounds of his city seep into the recordings; the tracks sound simultaneously organic and artificially distressed."

Track listing

References

2011 albums
Marcellus Hall albums